Premonition is a 2006 French drama film directed by and starring Jean-Pierre Darroussin, and based on the novel Le Pressentiment by Emmanuel Bove. It won the Louis Delluc Prize for Best First Film in 2006 and the award for Best First French Film from the French Syndicate of Cinema Critics in 2007.

Cast 

 Jean-Pierre Darroussin as Charles Benesteau
 Valérie Stroh as Isabelle Chevasse
 Amandine Jannin as Sabrina Jozic
 Hippolyte Girardot as Marc Bénesteau
 Nathalie Richard as Gabrielle Charmes-Aicquart
 Natalia Dontcheva as Helena Jozic
 Ivan Franek as Thomas Jozic
 Anne Canovas as Alice Benesteau
 Laurence Roy as Edith Benesteau
 Jonathan Altman as Ferdinand Benesteau
 Aristide Demonico as Monsieur Serrurier
 Michele Ernou as Madame Serrurier
 Mbembo as Eugénie
 Didier Bezace as Albert Testat
 Maurice Chevit as An old man
 Patrick Bonnel as Jean
 Vittoria Scognamiglio as Farida Garibaldi
 Thibault de Montalembert as The Inspector
 Lou-Nil Font as Victor Chevasse
 Alain Libolt as Edouard Benesteau
 François Monnié as Monsieur Garibaldi
 Antoine Valli as The neighbour

References

External links 
 

2006 films
2006 drama films
2000s French-language films
French drama films
Films based on French novels
Louis Delluc Prize winners
2006 directorial debut films
2000s French films